Ioannis Melissanidis (born 27 March 1977) is a retired Greek artistic gymnast and the 1996 Olympic champion on the floor exercise. He was also the first Greek gymnast ever to medal at the World Championships. He was named one of the 1996 Greek Male Athletes of the Year.

Early life and career
Melissanidis was born in Munich, Germany to parents Evangelos and Ekaterini, Greek nationals who were working in Germany. He hails from the village of Vyronia, Serres, and has two siblings, Maria and Spiros. When Melissanidis was 2 years old his family returned to Thessaloniki, which he considers his hometown.

Melissanidis began training gymnastics and classical ballet at the age of 9 and a half. His parents were not originally supportive of the idea, and, according to Melissanidis, only relented and took him to the Spartakos Thessaloniki gymnastics club after he refused to eat for two days.

At his first Junior European Championships in 1991 Melissanidis placed a modest 18th in the all-around, but earned a bronze medal on the floor exercise, placing ahead of future World Champions Ivan Ivankov and Yordan Yovchev. Two years later, in 1993, he won the floor title at Junior Europeans and placed third on the vault.

In 1994, defended his floor exercise title at the 1994 Junior European Championships in Prague, marking his third time medaling as a junior on this apparatus. 1994 was also his first year competing as a senior, and at age 17, he tied with Great Britain's Neil Thomas for the silver medal on floor at the  1994 World Championships. With this medal, Melissanidis became the first Greek gymnast, male or female, to medal at the World Championships.

Although Melissanidis competed at the 1995 and 1996 World Championships, he did not qualify to an apparatus final. However, at the 1996 Olympics in Atlanta, Melissanidis won the floor exercise gold medal with a score of 9.850. The win marked the first Olympics gymnastics medal for Greece since 1906.

Melissanidis continued competing after 1996, winning the vault title at the 1998 European Championships in Saint Petersburg. He represented Greece at the 2000 Summer Olympics in Sydney, but, struggling with injury, competed only on vault and high bar.

Skills
The hallmark of Melissanidis' floor exercises was two specific kinds of combinations: (a) backward saltos out of a whipback and (b) front tuck saltos (with or without a full twist) rebounding forward out of the landing of a backward salto. He often did both types of combinations in the same series, e.g., whip + double layout + rebound front tuck.

Melissanidis has one vault named after him in the Code of Points; the Yurchenko double back in tuck position. In the current Code of Points, his vault carries a D-score (difficulty rating) of 5.2. For some time, the piked version was also credited to him, but it is now credited to Yang Wei, who debuted it in 2002.

Personal and professional life
In 1996, Melissanidis publicly came out as a gay man. 

In recent years, Melissanidis has been active in various social and athletic causes. He is a supporter of Greenpeace, and, in 2003, publicly supported the Melina Mercouri Foundation's campaign to return the Parthenon sculptures in the British Museum to Greece. A gymnastics hall in his hometown of Thessaloníki has been named in his honor. He was also one of the torchbearers in the 2004 Summer Olympics Opening Ceremony in Athens.

As of 2008, he was a student at the American Academy of Dramatic Arts in Los Angeles.  He was also an invited guest of the 2008 Olympic competition in China and toured Chinese universities as an International Olympic representative.

In 2017, Melissanidis was selected by ANT1 to be a judge on the show So You Think You Can Dance.

References

External links
 
 
 

1977 births
Living people
Greek male artistic gymnasts
Gymnasts at the 1996 Summer Olympics
Olympic gold medalists for Greece
Gymnasts at the 2000 Summer Olympics
Olympic gymnasts of Greece
Medalists at the World Artistic Gymnastics Championships
European champions in gymnastics
Originators of elements in artistic gymnastics
Sport in Thessaloniki
Olympic medalists in gymnastics
LGBT gymnasts
Greek gay men
Greek LGBT sportspeople
Gay sportsmen
Medalists at the 1996 Summer Olympics
Gymnasts from Thessaloniki